Hassan Abdallah; (born August 1, 1960) is an Egyptian financier. He is the current governor of the Central Bank of Egypt and was previously the Chief Executive Officer of the Arab African International Bank (AAIB), a regional financial services institution. Established by a special law as a joint venture between the Central Bank of Egypt (CBE) and the Kuwait Investment Authority (KIA), AAIB was Egypt's first Arab multinational bank.

Abdalla joined the bank in 1982 and by 2002 had become CEO. In parallel to his executive mandate, Abdalla has also been an adjunct finance professor at the American University in Cairo (AUC) for the past 18 years.

In August 2022, Hassan Abdallah was appointed as the new acting governor of the Central Bank of Egypt (CBE) by presidential decree.

Early life and education 

Hassan Abdallah was born in Cairo in 1960 to Egyptian parents. He attended the Port Said School in Zamalek for his junior and high school education. He went on to attend the American University in Cairo (AUC), where he graduated with a BA in Business Administration in 1982. Abdalla returned to AUC in 1992 to receive his MBA.[5]

Career and business ventures timeline 

In 1982 Abdallah joined AAIB, starting in the bank's dealing room, then moved to AAIB's New York City branch in 1988 to manage its US treasury portfolio and hedging policy, while working on portfolio restructuring of bond swaps, in 1994 Abdallah got promoted to Assistant General Manager, then to General manager of AAIB in 1999, In 2002 he was appointed Vice Chairman and Managing Director.

Current positions 

 Chief Executive Officer of Arab African International Bank (AAIB)
 Chairman of UBAF Hong Kong
 Board member of UBAF Paris
 Board member of UBAC Curaçao
 Board member of London Stock Exchange - London Africa Advisory Group "LAAG"7
 Vice Chairman of German-Arab Chamber of Industry and Commerce
 Founder and Chairman of "We owe it to Egypt"8
 Chairman of the Arab African Investment Management Company
 Chairman of Sandah for Microfinance
 Member of the Strategic Advisory Board of the School of Business at the AUC
 Board member of Arab Educational Information Network – Shamaa.

Previous positions 

 Board member of the Egyptian European Association for Economic & Social Development
 Director of Arab Banker's Association – London (ABA)
 Member of New York-based World President's Organization (WPO)
 Executive board member of Egypt International Economic Forum (EIEF)
 Board member of Egyptian National Competitiveness Council
 Board member of Egypt-US Business Council
 Chairman of International Securities Market Association (ISMA) Middle East Regional Committee
 Board member of the Young President Organization - New York, USA
 Technical Advisor to the Arab Academy for Financial & Banking Studies Member of AISEC - Egypt
 Board member of Egyptian European Association for Economic & Social Development
 Board member of the Egyptian Capital Association (ECMA)
 Board member of Orascom Construction Industries (OCI)
 Board member of Ghabbour Auto (GA)
 Board member of the Central Bank of Egypt (CBE)
 Board member of Egyptian Stock Exchange (EGX)
 Board member of The Coca-Cola Bottling Company of Egypt
 Board member of Endeavour Egypt
 Board member of Telecom Egypt
 Founding member of the Egyptian National Competitiveness Council (ENCC)
 Founding member and former chairman of the Egyptian Junior Business Association (EJBA)
 Board of trustees member of the Egyptian Banking Institute (EBI)
 Chairman of the Middle East, Far East, and Africa regional committee of the International Capital Association in Zurich (ICMA)
 Board member of Directors of the Institute of International Finance (IIF)
 Board member of the Emerging Markets Advisory Council (EMAC) of the Institute of International Finance.

Further reading 
 "AAIB achieving exceptional growth in difficult circumstances"
 Hassan Abdalla, the force behind the success story of AAIB
 Interview with Global Banking and Finance Review on the occasion of winning Best Investment Bank in Egypt for 2016
 Interview with Global Banking and Finance Review on the occasion of winning Best Investment Bank in Egypt for 2017
Interview Hassan Abdalla with Banker Africa magazine
 Ones to watch 2017: Hassan Abdallah.

References 

1960 births
 Living people
Governors of the Central Bank of Egypt